Aulocheta is a genus of moths of the family Erebidae. The genus was erected by Alice Ellen Prout in 1927.

Species
 Aulocheta parallelalis (Mabille, 1880) Madagascar
 Aulocheta violacea A. E. Prout, 1927 São Tomé

References

Hypeninae